Jeanne de Brigue (died 19 August 1391) was a French soothsayer accused of witchcraft.

Biography
Brigue originally from the Ardennes was accused of witchcraft, while still young, described as of childbearing age, and tried in 1390. It was the first witch trial believed to be held at Le Châtelet in Paris. Local women who were known for having various healing powers or the ability to do magic were falling foul of the law and the church. Brigue was one of several women convicted of witchcraft. Her godmother, Jeanne, supposedly instructed her who taught her how to control the demon Haussibut while Marion her neighbor from Doue, Seine-et-Marne, taught her the art of divination. Brigue was said to be able to find lost objects and there were a number of witnesses called to describe events where she was involved in the return or identify to thefts.

She was condemned by Jean de Folleville, the Provost of Paris, to be burned at the Place du Marché aux Pourceaux.  She died 1391 in Paris.

Sources

1391 deaths
Witch trials in France
People executed by burning
14th-century executions by France
People executed for witchcraft